James Brett (first name and dates unknown) was an English first-class cricketer associated with Marylebone Cricket Club (MCC) who played in the 1800s. He is recorded in one match, totalling 0 runs with a highest score of 0, therefore averaging 0.

References

English cricketers
English cricketers of 1787 to 1825
Non-international England cricketers
Year of birth unknown
Year of death unknown